Wakefieldite-(La) is the lanthanum analogue of the uncommon rare-earth element vanadate mineral Wakefieldite. It is a member of the xenotime group.

Wakefieldite-(La) was first described in 2008 for an occurrence in the Glücksstern mine, Gottlob Hill, Friedrichroda, Thuringia, Germany.

References

Lanthanum minerals
Vanadate minerals
Tetragonal minerals
Minerals in space group 141
Minerals described in 2008